Three ships of the Royal Navy have borne the name HMS North Star, named after the pole star:

  was a 20-gun sixth rate launched in 1810. She was sold in 1817 and became the mercantile Columbo.
  was a 28-gun sixth rate launched in 1824. She was broken up in 1860.
  was an  launched in 1916. She was sunk in 1918 by coastal artillery near Zeebrugge.

References
 

Royal Navy ship names